The Federation of International Touch (FIT) is the worldwide governing body for Touch football. The Federation of International Touch was formed at a meeting held in conjunction with the Australian National championships, and first ever international representative fixtures between Australia and New Zealand, in Melbourne, 1985.

Events
Several international representative events are organised or sanctioned by FIT, including:

 Touch Football World Cup
 Youth Touch World Cup
 European Touch Championships ("the Euro's")
 European Junior Touch Championships ("the Youth Euro's")
 Asian Touch Cup
 Trans Tasman Test Series (between Australia and New Zealand), including Open, Youth, Senior divisions
 Pacific Games
 World Masters Games

Members
As of March 2022, FIT recognised the national governing bodies of 49 nations as members of the Federation:

 Asia (13):
  (China Touch Association)
  (Chinese Taipei Touch Association)
  (Hong Kong Touch Association)
  (Touch Rugby Federation of India)
  (Touch Rugby Japan)
  (Lebanon Touch Association)
  (FIT Touch Malaysia)
  (Middle East Touch)
  (Touch Association Pilipinas)
  (Qatar Touch Rugby)
  (Touch Singapore)  
  (Sri Lanka Touch Association) 
  (Thai Touch Football Association)

 Oceania (12):
  (Touch Football Australia)
  (Cook Islands Touch Association)
  (Touch Federation Fiji)
  (Kiribati National Touch Association)
  (Touch NZ)
  (Niue Touch Association)
  (Touch Football Papua New Guinea)
  (Samoa Touch Rugby)
 
 
  (Tonga National Touch Association)
  (Tuvalu Touch Association)

 Africa (1):
   (South African Touch Association)

 North America (2):
  (Touch Canada)
  (USA Touch)

 South America (1):
  (Touch Rugby Chile)

 Europe (20):
  (Touch Austria)
  (Touch Belgium)
  (Bulgaria Touch)
  (Czech Republic Touch)
  (England Touch Association)
 
  (Touch France)
  (Touch Deutschland)
  (Guernsey Touch)
  (Ireland Touch Association)
  (Italia Touch)
  (Jersey Touch)
  (Luxembourg National Touch Association)
  (Touch Nederland)
  (Touch Rugby Portugal)
  (Scottish Touch Association)
  (Touch España)
  (Sweden Touch)
  (Touch Switzerland)
  (Wales Touch Association)

References

External links
FIT Website
Asian Touch Federation
European Federation of Touch

National Bodies
For a full list of Member Nations click here
 Touch Football Australia
Belgian Touch (Touch Rugby Belgium) Website 
England Touch Association
Touch Rugby France Website
German Touch (Touch Deutschland) Website
Guernsey Touch (Guernsey Touch Association) Website
Luxembourg Touch (Luxembourg Touch) Website
New Zealand Touch (TouchNZ) Website
Scottish Touch Association
South African Touch (South African Touch Association) website 
Swiss Touch (Touch Switzerland) Website
Wales Touch (Wales Touch Association) Website
Italy Touch (Italian Touch Association) Website
Irish Touch Association Website

Touch (sport)
International sports organizations
Sports organizations established in 1985
1985 establishments in Australia